Victoria (meaning "the city Victoria"), also known among the native Maltese as Rabat (which is the name of the old town centre) or by its title Città Victoria, is an administrative unit of Malta, and the main town on Gozo,. Victoria has a total population of 6,901 (as of March 2014), and by population, is the largest locality in Gozo.

The area around the town, situated on a hill near the centre of the island, has been settled since Neolithic times. Victoria is the name given on 10 June 1887 by the British government on the occasion of Queen Victoria's Golden Jubilee, at the request of Pietro Monsignor Pace, Bishop of Gozo (Monsignor Pace later became Sir Pietro Monsignor Pace, Titular Archbishop of Rhodes and Bishop of Malta). However, many Gozitans, mainly older Gozitans, still often refer to it by the name Rabat.  It is usually known as Rabat, Gozo to distinguish it from the town of Rabat on the main island of Malta.

Architectural heritage

The Cittadella, including:
Gozo Museum of Archaeology
Gran Castello Historic House (Folklore Museum)
Natural Science Museum
Old Prison
St George's Basilica (St George's Square)
Heart of Gozo: Il-Hagar Museum (St George's Square)
War Memorial (Independence Square)
Banca Giuratale (Independence Square)
St Francis' Church (St Francis Square)
War shelter under the Cittadella (Cittadella) 
War Shelter under Triq id-Dejqa (Narrow Street)
War Shelter under St Augustine's Square (St Augustine's Convent)

Churches in Victoria
St Mary's Cathedral
St. George's Basilica, Malta
St Francis Conventual Church (Franciscan Friars)
St James the Greater Church
Nativity of Mary Church (Savina)
St Augustine Church (Augustinian Friars)
St John Bosco Oratory Church
St Martha's Church
Annunciation Church
Cana Movement Church
Good Shepherd Church
Manresa Church (Jesuits)
Our Lady of Grace Church (Capuchin Friars)
Our Lady Help of Christians Church (Salesian Nuns)
Immaculate Heart of Mary Church (Franciscan Nuns)
Our Lady of Pompei Church (Dominican Nuns)
St Barbara's Church (Citadel)
St Joseph's Church (Citadel)
Immaculate Conception Church (Seminary)
Nazareth Chapel (Poor Clares)

Cittadella

In the heart of Victoria lies the Cittadella (Citadel), formerly known as il Castello, which has been the centre of activity of the island since possibly Neolithic times, but is known to be first fortified during the Bronze Age c. 1500 BC. It was later developed by the Phoenicians and continued into becoming a complex Acropolis by Roman times.

The north side of the Citadel dates back to the Aragonese domination period. The south flank, overlooking Victoria, was re-constructed under the Knights of St. John, namely between 1599 and 1603, after Ottomans invaded the city in 1551. The massive defensive stone walls of the fortifications rise above the town and were built by the Knights to protect the village communities from foraging corsairs attempting to take slaves and threatened invasion of Moslem forces fighting Christendom.

Within its walls lies a fine 17th century baroque Cathedral designed by Lorenzo Gafà, the Maltese architect who also built the Cathedral of Mdina. It is said that it lies on the site where a Roman temple dedicated to Juno once stood. It is most famous for the remarkable trompe-l'œil painting on its ceiling, which depicts the interior of a dome that was never built.

St George's Parish

St. George's Basilica, Malta, which covers the whole of Victoria, caters for a little over half of the population of Victoria, as it is a personal parish (as opposed to other parishes who are territorial) operating in the city of Victoria. Its parish church dedicated to St George has the status of a Basilica.  This church was built in the 1670s and suffered severe damage in the earthquake of 1693. A new façade was built in 1818. The dome and the aisles are of recent construction (1930s and 1940s). There are several works of art in this church which include the painting of the dome and ceiling by Gian Battista Conti of Rome and other paintings and sculptures by Mattia Preti, Giuseppe d'Arena, Stefano Erardi, Alessio Erardi, Francesco V. Zahra, Giuseppe Calì, and contemporary Alfred Camilleri Cauchi and John L. Grima.  The titular statue of St George was carved from solid wood by Pietro Paolo Azzopardi in 1838 and is the first titular statue on the island. The area over which the church is built is of considerable archaeological interest.

The parish celebrates two feasts during the year: 23 April, the official date celebrating the death of the martyr, and the third Sunday of July, when the solemn festivities in honour of Gozo's patron saint are held.

In February 2013, the Basilica opened the doors to its new modern museum, one of a kind in the country. It is the first building built for the purpose of a museum. The Museum and cultural centre, named as Heart of Gozo: Il-Hagar, displays a rich collection of historical and artistic artefacts previously inaccessible to the general public. The museum is found on the left side of the Basilica.

Villa Rundle Gardens

These gardens are situated between Republic Street and the Main Car Park in Victoria. 
One can see in these gardens a bronze bust of the Gozitan 18th-century historian and grammarian Can. Giovanni Pietro Francesco Agius de Soldanis and another of Gozo born French poet and writer Laurent Ropa. One can also find a memorial commemorating the invasion of Gozo by Ottomans in 1551.

Notable people from Victoria

Censu Tabone, 4th President of Malta
Gaetano Pace Forno, Bishop of Malta
George Pisani, Poet
Giovanni Pietro Francesco Agius de Soldanis, Archpriest 
Giuseppe Monsignor Pace, 7th Bishop of Gozo
Joseph Farrugia, (Archpriest Emeritus of St George's)
Joseph Monsignor Mercieca, Archbishop of Malta
Sir Pietro Monsignor Pace, Titular Archbishop of Rhodes and Bishop of Malta
Alfred Xuereb, private secretary to Pope Francis
Mary Meilak, Poet
Ninu Cremona, Author

Zones in Victoria

Belliegħa 
Ċittadella (Citadel)
Demnija 
Gelmus 
Għajn Lukin 
Il-Ġnien 
Qasam San Ġorġ
Sellum 
Ta' Ħamet 
Ta' l-Ibraġ  
Ta' Mliet 
Ta' Wara s-Sur 
Taċ-Ċawla 
Taflija 
Tal-Far 
Tal-Grazzja 
Tal-Maltija 
Tal-Mejda 
Villa Rundle 
Wied Tal-Grazzja
Kapuccini

Victoria Main Roads

Pjazza Fuq it-Tomba (Tomba Square)
Pjazza Indipendenza (Independence Square)
Pjazza San Frangisk (St Francis Square)
Pjazza San Gorg (St George's Square)
Pjazza Santu Wistin (St Augustine Square)
Triq Dingli (Dingli Street)
Triq Enriku Mizzi (Enrico Mizzi Street) 
Triq Fortunato Mizzi (Fortunato Mizzi Street)
Triq Gedrin
Triq George Borg Olivier
Triq Għajn Qatet
Triq Ġużè Ellul Mercer (G. Ellul Mercer Street)
Triq id-Dawwara
Triq il-Kappuċċini (Capuchins' Street)
Triq il-Papa Ġwanni Pawlu II (Pope John Paul II Street)
Triq ir-Repubblika (Republic Street)
Triq it-Tabib Anton Tabone (Dr Anton Tabone Street)
Triq l-Ewropa (Europe Street)
Triq l-Imgħallem (Foreman Street)
Triq Mejlak (Mejlak Road)
Triq Monsinjur S. Lanzon (Mgr. S. Lanzon Street)
Triq Ninu Cremona (Ninu Cremona Street)
Triq Putirjal (Main Gate Street)
Triq Sant' Orsla (St Ursola Street)
Triq Ta' Kerċem (Kercem Road)
Triq Tomba (Tomba Street)
Triq Viani (Viani Street)
Triq Wara s-Sur (By the Bastion Street)
Triq Wied il-Lunzjata (Lunzjata Valley Road)i

Feasts of Victoria, Gozo
Five feasts are celebrated in Victoria, the island of Gozo, the two main feasts are the feast of St. George and the feast of Assumption of the Virgin Mary. The feast dedicated to St. Mary, devoted in its Cathedral situated in the centre of the Citadel dominating the whole island is celebrated on 15 August. The other one is dedicated to St. George, the patron saint of Gozo celebrated on the 3rd Sunday of July in St George's Basilica.

In Victoria, there is the feast of the Immaculate Conception in the church of St Francis this feast is celebrated on 8 December of every year by the Franciscan conventual friars. A feast of Our Lady of Divine Grace is celebrated as the last feast of the feast season by the Franciscan capuchin friars in the church dedicated to Our Lady of Divine Grace. The feast of St. John Bosco is celebrated in the Don Bosco Oratory.

Sports
Victoria is home to three football clubs, S.K. Victoria Wanderers, Victoria Hotspurs and Oratory Youths.

Twin towns – sister cities

Victoria is twinned with:
 Nichelino, Italy

References

External links

Ministry of Gozo - Victoria
Victoria Local Council
Gozo Culture & Information Office
St George's Basilica Museum
Lehen il-Belt Victoria Radio
Don Bosco Oratory
Festival Mediterranea
Gozo Cathedral
Leone Philharmonic Society AD 1863
La Stella Philharmonic Society AD 1863
St George's Basilica
Visit Malta - Citadella and Victoria

 
Local councils of Malta
Gozo